Larba is a rural locality (a settlement) in Larbinsky Selsoviet of Tyndinsky District, Amur Oblast, Russia. The population was 416 as of 2018. There are 6 streets.

Geography 
Larba is located by the Nyukzha river, 136 km northwest of Tynda (the district's administrative centre) by road. Khorogochi is the nearest rural locality.

References 

Rural localities in Tyndinsky District